Andis Juška (born 22 May 1985) is a Latvian tennis coach and former player.
Juška's career-high singles ranking was world No. 226, achieved in October 2009. For several years, he was the second-highest ATP-ranked Latvian tennis player.

He is currently the coach of American player Amanda Anisimova, and former coach of Ukrainian player Elina Svitolina. In addition, Andis has worked with Latvian tennis player Jeļena Ostapenko.

In addition to coaching individual players, in 2008, Juska was the captain of Latvian team for Billie Jean King Cup.

Tennis career

Juniors 
As a junior, Juška reached as high as no. 43 in the junior world singles rankings in 2002 (and no. 15 in doubles). He competed in the main draw of the Australian Open boys' singles event in both 2002 and 2003, also reaching the quarterfinals of the doubles event in the latter year.

Pro tour 
Juška has won 17 events at the ITF Futures level. Juška has yet to play in an ATP World Tour or Grand Slam event main draw.

References

External links 
 
 
 Andis Juska statistics at tennisinsight.com

1985 births
Living people
Latvian male tennis players
Sportspeople from Riga